Imagine Prep at Surprise is a public charter school in Surprise, Arizona, and  is a member of the Cambridge international program offering the Cambridge Advanced International Certificate of Education (AICE) and Grand Canyon Diploma along with college level courses.

The school opened on September 2, 2008. It is operated by Imagine Schools. The school is a member of the Canyon Athletic Association.

Sports 
Fall Sports:
 Cheer & Dance
 Cross Country
 Esports (League of Legends, Rocket League)
 Middle School/High School Football
 Middle School/High School Volleyball

Winter Sports:
 Middle School Boys Basketball
 Varsity Boys/Girls Basketball
 Competitive Chess
 Middle School Softball
 Wrestling

Spring Sports:
 Esports (League of Legends, Rocket League)
 Middle School Baseball
 Middle School Girls Basketball
 Middle School/High School Soccer
 Varsity Softball
 Track & Field

Honored teachers 
Imagine Prep at Surprise has three teachers (Alexa Pupo, 2018;  Sara Schultz Camren, 2019; and Vicki Robinson, 2020) who have won the Imagine Schools National Teacher of the year award. The National competition involves video recommendations and praise from students and parents as well as a portfolio and interviews.

References

Public high schools in Arizona
Schools in Maricopa County, Arizona
Charter schools in Arizona
Educational institutions established in 2008
2008 establishments in Arizona